Blue-winged Olive flies is a collective term used by anglers in fly fishing to identify a broad array of mayflies having olive, olive-brown bodies and bluish wings in their adult form. Sometimes referred to as  BWO , a wide array of artificial flies are tied to imitate adult, nymphal and emerging stages of the aquatic insect. While the family Baetidae probably has the most species identified as blue-winged olives, another mayfly family Ephemerellidae also contains some. Collectively, blue-winged olive mayflies are an important food source in most trout streams, thus their widespread imitation by fly tiers.

History
The first mention of Blue-winged Olive as common name may be in Frederick Halford's Dry Fly Entomology (1897). Halford's Blue-winged Olives were identified as members of the genus Ephemerella. Both Alfred Ronald's Fly-Fisher's Entomology (1837) and Mary Orvis Marbury's Favorite Flies and Their Histories (1892) do not refer to any flies as Blue-winged Olives.  There is ample evidence in fly fishing literature that what are now called Blue-winged Olives were once called Olive Duns, Blue Duns, Iron-blue Duns, Olive Quills, etc.

General description
Swisher and Richards' Selective Trout (1971) gives the following description:

List of Blue-winged Olive patterns

Adult patterns

Duns

Spinners

References

Fly fishing